The 2010 Tour de Wallonie was the 37th edition of the Tour de Wallonie cycle race and was held from 24 to 28 July 2010. The race started in Mouscron and finished in Welkenraedt. The race was won by Russell Downing.

General classification

References

Tour de Wallonie
Tour de Wallonie